Thorelliola is a genus of jumping spiders that was first described by Embrik Strand in 1942. It is named after arachnologist Tamerlan Thorell.

Species
 it contains nineteen species, found in Asia, on the Marshall Islands, in Kiribati, Papua New Guinea, and on the Polynesian Islands:
Thorelliola aliena Zhang & Maddison, 2012 – New Guinea
Thorelliola biapophysis Gardzinska & Patoleta, 1997 – Indonesia (Banda Is.)
Thorelliola crebra Zhang & Maddison, 2012 – New Guinea
Thorelliola cyrano Szűts & De Bakker, 2004 – New Guinea
Thorelliola dissimilis Gardzińska, 2009 – New Guinea
Thorelliola doryphora (Thorell, 1881) – New Guinea
Thorelliola dumicola Berry, Beatty & Prószyński, 1997 – Caroline Is.
Thorelliola ensifera (Thorell, 1877) (type) – Malaysia to Sulawesi, Hawaii, French Polynesia (Marquesas Is., Society Is., Tuamotu)
Thorelliola glabra Gardzinska & Patoleta, 1997 – Indonesia (Banda Is.)
Thorelliola javaensis Gardzinska & Patoleta, 1997 – Indonesia (Java)
Thorelliola joannae Zhang & Maddison, 2012 – New Guinea
Thorelliola mahunkai Szüts, 2002 – New Guinea
Thorelliola monoceros (Karsch, 1881) – Marshall Is.
Thorelliola pallidula Gardzińska, 2009 – New Guinea
Thorelliola squamosa Zhang & Maddison, 2012 – New Guinea
Thorelliola tamasi Zhang & Maddison, 2012 – New Guinea
Thorelliola truncilonga Gardzinska & Patoleta, 1997 – New Guinea
Thorelliola tualapa Zhang & Maddison, 2012 – New Guinea
Thorelliola zabkai Zhang & Maddison, 2012 – New Guinea

References

Salticidae genera
Salticidae
Spiders of Hawaii
Spiders of Indonesia
Spiders of Oceania
Taxa named by Embrik Strand